Francesco Eroli (died 1540) was Bishop of Spoleto from 1500 to 1540. He opposed what he saw as the invasion of his rights by the abbot of Spoletto. He excommunicated the abbot of Spoletto when the abbot defied him, but was overturned by the pope. He was succeeded by Fabio Agatidio Vigili in September 1540.

References

External links and additional sources
  (for Chronology of Bishops)  
 (Chronology of Bishops) 

1540 deaths
People from Narni
Bishops of Spoleto